Josef Trousílek (March 16, 1918 in Prague, Austria-Hungary – October 10, 1990 in Prague, Czechoslovakia) was an ice hockey player for the Czechoslovak national team. He won a silver medal at the 1948 Winter Olympics.

References

External links

1918 births
1990 deaths
HC Slavia Praha players
HC Sparta Praha players
Ice hockey players at the 1948 Winter Olympics
Medalists at the 1948 Winter Olympics
Olympic ice hockey players of Czechoslovakia
Olympic medalists in ice hockey
Olympic silver medalists for Czechoslovakia
Ice hockey people from Prague
Czech ice hockey defencemen
Czech ice hockey coaches
Czechoslovak ice hockey coaches
Czechoslovak ice hockey defencemen